The Man from Blankley's is a lost 1930 American pre-Code comedy film, directed by Alfred E. Green. It starred John Barrymore and Loretta Young. The film was based on the 1903 play by Thomas Anstey Guthrie, writing under the pseudonym "F. Anstey". The film was Barrymore's second feature length all-talking film. A previous silent film version of Anstey's play by Paramount Pictures appeared in 1920 as The Fourteenth Man starring Robert Warwick. That version is also lost.

Plot
The trouble begins when Lord Strathpeffer (John Barrymore), who is on his way to visit an Egyptologist with a case of instruments used by entomologists, loses his way in the fog and wanders into the home (who lives next door to the Egyptologist) of a woman who is hosting a fancy dinner. Mr. and Mrs. Tidmarsh (Dick Henderson and Emily Fitzroy), a middle-class English couple, are giving a dinner party in honor of their wealthy uncle, Gabriel Gilwattle (Albert Gran), hoping to receive his financial aid in their struggle to keep up appearances.

As a result of many of the invitees informing Mrs. Tidmarsh that they could not attend her party, she believes that only 13 guests will show up. As Gilwattle is a superstitious man, Mrs. Tidmarsh sends to the Blankley Employment Agency to send them a distinguished looking man to serve as a guest. In the meantime some other guests inform Fitzroy that they won't be able to come and the hired man is no longer needed. She informs the agency that the man is no longer needed. Nevertheless, when Barrymore arrives at the door, they automatically assume that he was sent by the agency and invite him in to dinner.

Mayhem ensues. Margery Seaton (Loretta Young), one of the dinner guests, recognizes Barrymore as a former lover, and therefore assumes him to be an impostor. Sobering, Strathpeffer realizes he has come to the wrong party and asserts his right to his title; but Gwennie (Angella Mawby) hides her father's watch in Strathpeffer's pocket as he is renewing his romance with Margery. A police inspector arrives hunting for the missing lord, establishing his authenticity and the fact that he is not, after all, the hired guest.

Cast
John Barrymore as Lord Strathpeffer
Loretta Young  as Margery Seaton
William Austin as Mr. Poffley
Albert Gran as Uncle Gabriel Gilwattle
Emily Fitzroy as Mrs. Tidmarsh
Yorke Sherwood as Mr. Bodfish
Dale Fuller as Miss Flinders
D'Arcy Corrigan - Mr. Ditchwater
Louise Carver as Mrs Gilwattle
Dick Henderson as Mr. Tidmarsh
Edgar Norton as Dawes
Diana Hope as Mrs. Bodfish
May Milloy as Mrs. Ditchwater
Angella Mawby as Gwennie
Gwendolyn Logan as Maid
Sybil Grove as Maid

1903 play
The play premiered in London in 1903 at the Prince of Wales Theatre and was revived in 1906 at the Haymarket Theatre to much success. It played on Broadway at the Criterion Theatre, from September 16 to November 1903, for 79 performances, before playing in Washington DC, Detroit and Chicago. It starred the British actors Sir Charles Hawtrey, Arthur Playfair and Faith Stone.

Reception

Box Office
According to Warner Bros records the film earned $311,000 domestically and $47,000 foreign.

Critical
The Outlook and Independent praised the film, stating that Barrymore had "reverted to type" and contributed in making a film that was a "highly entertaining and fantastic farse" and "one of the strangest and most delightfully insane comedies to reach the screen in years".

Preservation
The film is now considered to be a lost film. It was not available for television in the 1950s when Warners prepared many of their early talkies for 16mm acquisition by Associated Artists Productions. The soundtrack survives on Vitaphone discs, but all visual elements (print, negative, trailers and outtakes) are believed to be lost, with the exception of photographs (or stills) taken on the set during production. In December 1967, this film was included to AFI's "rescue list".

See also
List of lost films
List of incomplete or partially lost films

References
Notes

Bibliography

External links 

still of John Barrymore from the movie

1903 plays
1930 films
Films directed by Alfred E. Green
1930 comedy films
1930s English-language films
American black-and-white films
Lost American films
Warner Bros. films
Films set in London
American comedy films
1930 lost films
Lost comedy films
1930s American films
Remakes of American films